Ain Janna (Arabic: عين جنّا) is a village located in the Ajloun Governorate in the north-western part of Jordan.
The name is Arabic for Spring of Paradise: Ain is a spring (of water), and Janna is Paradise. The name was being his own given to the village due to the abundance of water springs and apparent availability of water in the village and its surroundings. As a matter of fact, Ain Janna still has some springs, causing its landscape to be green and crystal clear. It lies on two juxtaposed mountains, and has a view over Ajlun's Castle and three towns. Average altitude of the village is about 1100 meters above sea level, causing most of the houses in the village to have a view reaching far beyond Jordan; one can easily see some mountains of Nablus in the West Bank (about 30 km /22 miles air distance).

History
It had a population of 43 Muslim households and 3 Muslim bachelors, in addition to 12 Christian households and 3 Christian bachelors. They paid a fixed tax-rate of 25%  on various  agricultural products, including wheat, barley, summer crops, olive trees, goats and beehives, in addition to  occasional revenues and for an olive oil press/press for grape syrup; a total of  10,000 akçe.

In 1838 'Anjara's inhabitants were predominantly Sunni Muslims and Greek Christians.

References

Bibliography

External links
 Ajlun Discussion Forum 

Populated places in Ajloun Governorate
Tourism in Jordan